Union Deportiva de Tánger, also known as Unión Deportiva España de Tánger, was a football club based in Tangier during its Spanish protectorate.

History
The La Unión Deportiva España de Tánger "UDET in Spanish, or Unión Deportiva de Tánger UDT'', also known as 'España de Tánger', was a Spanish football club founded in Tangier. The Unión Deportiva España de Tánger was one of the teams in the Spanish Second Division during the 1950s.

Until Moroccan independence, football competition in the Spanish protectorate (to which only Tangier belonged between 1940 and 1945) was run by the Spanish Football League. In Morocco there were other teams of Spanish origin, such as the Unión Deportiva Sevillana, the Unión Tangerina, the Fútbol Club Iberia or the Club Atlético Tetuán.

In 1956, after the independence of Morocco, the club merged with Algeciras CF to form España de Algeciras CF before switching back to Algeciras CF in the following year.

Season to season

 3 seasons in Segunda División
 5 seasons in Tercera División

Former players

See also
Algeciras CF
Real Federación de Fútbol de Ceuta
EHA Tánger
Unión Tangerina
FC Iberia
La Sevillana

External links
BDFutbol profile

1956 disestablishments in Morocco
Association football clubs disestablished in 1956
Football clubs in Andalusia
Algeciras CF
Sport in Tangier
Spanish Africa
Segunda División clubs